Shubhra is a popular given name in India. It means "fair" or "white" in Sanskrit. It can be a female or male name. Usually the male name Shubhra is a shortened version of a longer name such as Subhrakant.

Persons with this name
Subhra Guha, Indian singer of Hindustani classical music
Subhra Sourav Das, Indian actor

Fictional characters sharing this name
Shuvro (শুভ্র in Bengali), sometimes transliterated as Shubhro or Śubhra, a fictional character created by Bangladeshi writer Humayun Ahmed.

References

Given names